The New Order of Europe was the political order which Nazi Germany wanted to impose on the areas  of Europe which were conquered and therefore under its dominion. The establishment of the  had already begun long before the start of World War II, but it was publicly proclaimed by Adolf Hitler in 1941: "The year 1941 will be, I am convinced, the historical year of a great European New Order!"

Among other things, it entailed the creation of a pan-German racial state, structured according to Nazi ideology, to ensure the existence of a perceived Aryan-Nordic master race, consolidate a massive territorial expansion into Central and Eastern Europe through colonization by German settlers, achieve the physical annihilation of Jews, Slavs (especially Poles and Russians), Roma ("gypsies"), and other people whose lives were considered "unworthy of life", as well as the extermination, expulsion or enslavement of most of the Slavic peoples and other people who were considered "racially inferior". Nazi Germany's desire for aggressive territorial expansionism was one of the most important causes of World War II.

Historians are still divided as to its ultimate goals, some believing that it was to be limited to Nazi German domination of Europe, while others maintain that it was a springboard for eventual world conquest and the establishment of a world government under German control.

Origin of the term

The term Neuordnung originally had a more limited meaning than it did later. It is typically translated as "New Order", but a more correct translation would be more akin to "reorganization". When it was used in Germany during the Third Reich era, it referred specifically to the desire of the Nazis to redraw the state borders within Europe, thereby transforming the existing geopolitical structures. In the same sense, it has also been used, now and in the past, to denote similar re-orderings of the international political order such as those following the Peace of Westphalia in 1648, the Congress of Vienna in 1815, and the Allied victory in 1945. The complete phrase used by the Nazi establishment was actually die Neuordnung Europas (the New Order of Europe), for which Neuordnung was merely a shorthand. (Distinguish the European "New Order" from the neo-fascist New European Order (founded in 1951), established as an alleged "Black International".)

According to the Nazi government, that principle was pursued by Germany to secure a fair rearrangement of territory for the common benefit of a new, economically integrated Europe, which in Nazi terminology meant the continent of Europe with the exception of the "Asiatic" Soviet Union. Nazi racial views regarded the "Judeo-Bolshevist" Soviet state as both a criminal institution which needed to be destroyed, and as a barbarian place lacking any culture that would give it a "European" character. Therefore, Neuordnung was rarely used in reference to Soviet Russia, because the Nazis believed it did not feature any elements that could be re-organized along National Socialist lines.

The objective was to ensure a state of total post-war continental hegemony for Nazi Germany.
That was to be achieved by the expansion of the territorial base of the German state itself, combined with the political and economic subjugation of the rest of Europe to Germany. Eventual extensions of the project to areas beyond Europe, as well as on an ultimately global scale, were anticipated for the future period in which Germany would have secured unchallenged control over her own continent, but Neuordnung did not carry that extra-European meaning at the time.

Through its wide use in Nazi propaganda, the phrase quickly gained resonance in Western media. In English-language academic circles especially, it eventually carried a much more inclusive definition, and was increasingly used to refer to the foreign and domestic policies, and the war aims, of the Nazi state, and of its dictatorial leader Adolf Hitler. Therefore, the phrase had approximately the same connotations as the term co-prosperity sphere did in  Japanese circles, in reference to their planned imperial domain. Nowadays, it is generally used to refer to all the post-war plans and policies, both in and outside of Europe, that the Nazis expected to implement after the anticipated victory of Germany and the other Axis powers in World War II.

Ideological background

Racialist doctrine

The Nazis claimed to scientifically measure a strict hierarchy of human race. The "master race" was said to comprise the purest stock of the Aryan race, which was narrowly defined by the Nazis as being identical with the Nordic race, followed by other sub-Aryan races. The Nazis said that because Western civilization, created and maintained mostly by Nordics, was obviously superior to other civilizations, the "Nordic" peoples were superior to all other races and were entitled to dominate the world, a concept known as Nordicism.

Geopolitical strategy

Hitler's ideas about the eastward expansion that he promulgated in Mein Kampf were greatly influenced during his 1924 imprisonment by his contact with his geopolitical mentor Karl Haushofer.  One of Haushofer's primary geopolitical concepts was the necessity for Germany to get control of the Eurasian Heartland in order for it to attain eventual world domination.

Anticipated territorial extent of Nazi imperialism

In a subsequently published speech given at Erlangen University in November 1930, Hitler explained to his audience that no other people had more of a right to fight for and attain "control" of the globe (Weltherrschaft, i.e. "world leadership", "world rule") than the Germans. He realized that an extremely ambitious goal could never be achieved without significant military effort. Hitler had alluded to future German world dominance even earlier in his political career. In a letter written by Rudolf Hess to Walter Hewel in 1927, Hess paraphrases Hitler's vision: "World peace is certainly an ideal worth striving for; in Hitler's opinion it will be realizable only when one power, the racially best one has attained complete and uncontested supremacy. That [power] can then provide a sort of world police, seeing to it at the same time that the most valuable race is guaranteed the necessary living space. And if no other way is open to them, the lower races will have to restrict themselves accordingly".

Heinrich Himmler discussed the territorial aspirations of Germany during his first Posen speech in 1943. He commented on the goals of the warring nations involved in the conflict and stated that Germany was fighting for new territories and a global power status:

Implementation in Europe

Military campaigns in Poland and Western Europe
The initial phase of the establishment of the New Order was:
 First, the signing of the German–Soviet non-aggression agreement on 23 August 1939 prior to the invasion of Poland to secure the new eastern border with the Soviet Union, prevent the emergence of a two-front war, and to circumvent a shortage of raw materials due to an expected British naval blockade.
 Second, the Blitzkrieg attacks in northern and western Europe (Operation Weserübung and the Battle of France respectively) to neutralize opposition from the west. This resulted in the conquest of Denmark, Norway, Luxembourg, Belgium, the Netherlands, and France, all of which were under German rule by the early summer of 1940.

Had the British been defeated by Germany, the political re-ordering of Western Europe would have been accomplished. There was to be no post-war general peace conference in the manner of the one held in Paris after the First World War, merely bilateral negotiations between Germany and her defeated enemies.  All still existing international organizations such as the International Labour Organization were to be dismantled or replaced by German-controlled equivalents.

One of the primary German foreign policy aims throughout the 1930s had been to establish a military alliance with the United Kingdom, and despite anti-British policies having been adopted as this proved impossible, hope remained that the UK would in time yet become a reliable German ally. Hitler professed an admiration for the British Empire and preferred to see it preserved as a world power, mostly because its break-up would benefit other countries far more than it would Germany, particularly the United States and Japan. Britain's situation was likened to the historical situation of the Austrian Empire after its defeat by the Kingdom of Prussia in 1866, after which Austria was formally excluded from German affairs but would prove to become a loyal ally of the German Empire in the pre-World War I power alignments in Europe. It was hoped that a defeated Britain would fulfill a similar role, being excluded from continental affairs, but maintaining its Empire and becoming an allied seafaring partner of the Germans.

William L. Shirer, however, claims that the British male population between 17 and 45 would have been forcibly transferred to the continent to be used as industrial slave labour, although possibly with better treatment than similar forced labor from Eastern Europe. The remaining population would have been terrorized, including civilian hostages being taken and the death penalty immediately imposed for even the most trivial acts of resistance, with the UK being plundered for anything of financial, military, industrial or cultural value.

After the war, Otto Bräutigam of the Reich Ministry for the Occupied Eastern Territories claimed in his book that in February 1943 he had the opportunity to read a personal report by Wagner regarding a discussion with Heinrich Himmler, in which Himmler had expressed the intention to exterminate about 80% of the populations of France and England by special forces of the SD after the German victory.

By annexing large territories in northeastern France, Hitler hoped to marginalize the country to prevent any further continental challenges to Germany's hegemony. Likewise, the Latin nations of Western and Southern Europe (Portugal, Spain and Italy) were to be eventually brought into a state of total German dependency and control.

Establishment of a Greater Germanic Reich

One of the most elaborate Nazi projects initiated in the newly conquered territories during this period of the war was the planned establishment of a "Greater Germanic Reich of the German Nation" (Großgermanisches Reich Deutscher Nation). This future empire was to consist of, in addition to Greater Germany, virtually all of historically Germanic Europe (except Great Britain), whose inhabitants the Nazis believed to be "Aryan" in nature. The consolidation of these countries as mere provinces of the Third Reich, in the same manner in which Austria was reduced to the "Ostmark", was to be carried out through a rapidly enforced process of Gleichschaltung (synchronization). The ultimate intent of this was to eradicate all traces of national rather than racial consciousness, although their native languages were to remain in existence.

Establishment of German domination in Southeastern Europe

Immediately prior to Germany's invasion of the Soviet Union, five countries, Slovakia, Hungary, Romania, Bulgaria and Croatia were already client states of Nazi Germany. Serbia was under direct German military occupation and Montenegro was under the occupation of Italy. Albania had been annexed by Italy. Greece was under direct German-Italian military occupation because of the growing resistance movement. Although technically in the Italian sphere of influence, Croatia was, in reality, a condominium puppet state of the two Axis powers, with Italy controlling the southwestern half, and Germany the northeastern half. Hitler observed that permanent German bases might be established in Belgrade (possibly to be renamed to Prinz-Eugen-Stadt) and Thessaloniki.

Conquest of Lebensraum in Eastern Europe

Adolf Hitler in Mein Kampf argued in the chapter "Eastern Orientation or Eastern Policy" that the Germans needed Lebensraum in the East and described it as a "historic destiny" which would properly nurture the future generations of Germans. Hitler believed that "the organization of a Russian state formation was not the result of the political abilities of the Slavs in Russia, but only a wonderful example of the state-forming efficacity of the German element in an inferior race." Hitler spoke on 3 February 1933 to the staff of the army and declared that Germany's problems could be solved by "the conquest of new living space in the east and its ruthless Germanization". His earlier invasions of Czechoslovakia and Poland can be directly connected to his desire for Lebensraum in Mein Kampf.

Implementation of the long-term plan for the New Order was begun on June 22, 1941 with Operation Barbarossa, the invasion of the USSR. The goal of the campaign was not merely the destruction of the Soviet regime—which the Nazis considered illegitimate and criminal—but also the racial reorganization of European Russia, outlined for the Nazi elite in the Generalplan Ost ("General Plan for the East"). Nazi party philosopher Alfred Rosenberg (who, incidentally, protested against the inhumane policy shown toward the Slavs) was the Minister for the Eastern Territories, the person nominally in charge of the project, and Heinrich Himmler, head of the SS, was assigned to implement the General Plan for the East which detailed the enslavement, expulsion, and extermination of the Baltic peoples and Slavic peoples.

Furthermore, Hitler hoped to turn Germany into a total blockade-proof autarky by exploiting the vast resources lying in Soviet territories: Ukraine was to provide grain, vegetable oil, fodder, iron ore, nickel, manganese, coal, molybdenum; Crimea natural rubber, citrus fruit and cotton; the Black Sea fish, and the Caucasus crude oil.

By 1942 the quasi-colonial regimes called the General Government in Poland, the Reichskommissariat Ostland in the Baltic states and Belarus, and the Reichskommissariat Ukraine in Ukraine had been established. Two more administrative divisions were envisaged: a Reichskommissariat Moskowien that would include the Moscow metropolitan area and vast tracts of European Russia, and a Reichskommissariat Kaukasus in the Caucasus. This policy was accompanied by the annihilation of the entire Jewish population (the Final Solution), as well as the enslavement of their Slavic inhabitants, who it was planned, would be made slave laborers on the estates be granted to SS soldiers after the conquest of European Russia. Each of these SS "soldier peasants" was expected to father at least seven children.

German women were encouraged to have as many children as possible to populate the newly acquired Eastern territories. To encourage this fertility policy, the Lebensborn program was expanded and the state decoration known as the Gold Honor Cross of the German Mother was instituted, which was awarded to German women who bore at least eight children for the Third Reich. There was also an effort by Martin Bormann and Himmler to introduce new marriage legislation to facilitate population growth, which would have allowed decorated war heroes to marry an additional wife. Himmler envisaged a German population of 300,000,000 by 2000.

Rosenberg viewed that the political goal of Operation Barbarossa was not merely the destruction of the Bolshevik regime, but the "reversing of Russian dynamism" towards the east (Siberia) and the freeing of the Reich of the "eastern nightmare for centuries to come" by eliminating the Russian state, regardless of its political ideology. The continued existence of Russia as a potential instigator of Pan-Slavism and its suggestive power over other Slavic peoples in the fight between "Germandom" and "Slavism" was seen as a major threat. This was to be solved by exploiting ethnic centrifugal forces and limiting the influence of "Greater Russiandom" (Großrussentum) by promoting segmentation in the manner of divide and conquer.

In a memorandum sent to Rosenberg in March 1942, Nazi anthropologist Otto Reche argued for the disappearance of 'Russia' both as an ethnic and political concept, and the promotion of a new plethora of ethnicities based on medieval Slavic tribes such as the Vyatichs and Severians. Even White Ruthenia, and in particular the Ukraine ("in its present extent") he deemed to be dangerously large. Heinrich Himmler had already advocated for such a general policy towards Eastern Europe in 1940. A top-secret memorandum in 1940 from Himmler entitled "Thoughts on the Treatment of Alien Peoples in the East" expressed that the Germans must splinter as many ethnic splinter groups in German-occupied Europe as possible, including Ukrainians, "White Russians" (Belarusians), Gorals (see Goralenvolk), Lemkos, and Kashubians and to find all "racially valuable" people and assimilate them in Germany. The Eastern Ministry responded that Reche's emphasis on the plurality of ethnic groups in the Soviet Union was correct "in itself", but was skeptical about his proposal to resurrect obscure and extinct nationalities. He defended his proposal by arguing that "[sic] in the area of ethnicity much has already been successfully brought back to life!", but inquired as to whether names connected with the main towns in each area might serve this role instead. A memo date written by Erhard Wetzel from the NSDAP Office of Racial Policy administration, in April 1942 details the splitting up of Reichskommissariat Moskowien into very loosely tied Generalkommissariats. The objective was to undermine the national cohesion of the Russians by promoting regional identification; a Russian from the Gorki Generalkommissariat was to feel that he was different from a Russian in the Tula Generalkommissariat. Also, a source of discussion in the Nazi circles was the replacement of the Cyrillic letters with the German alphabet. In July 1944, Himmler ordered Ernst Kaltenbrunner, the head of the RSHA, to begin the exporting of the faith of the Jehovah's Witnesses to the occupied east. Himmler considered the Jehovah's Witnesses to be frugal, hard-working, honest and fanatic in their pacifism, and he believed that these traits were extremely desirable for the suppressed nations in the east — despite some 2,500 and 5,000 Jehovah's Witnesses becoming victims of the Holocaust.

A series of "semantic guidelines" published by the German Interior Ministry in 1942 declared that it was permissible to use the word 'Russia' only in a reference to the "Petersburg empire" of Peter the Great and its follow-ups until the revolution of 1917. The period from 1300 to Peter the Great (the Grand Duchy of Moscow and the Tsardom of Russia) was to be called the "Muscovite state", while post-1917 Russia was not to be referred to as an empire or a state at all; the preferred terms for this period were "bolshevik chaos" or "communist elements". Furthermore, historic expressions such as Little Russia (Ukraine), White Russia (Belarus/White Ruthenia), Russian Sea (for the Black Sea), and Russian Asia (for Siberia and Central Asia) were to be absolutely avoided as terminology of the "Muscovite imperialism". "Tatars" was described as a pejorative Russian term for the Volga, Crimean, and Azerbaijan Turks which was preferably to be avoided, and respectively replaced with the concepts "Idel (Volga)-Uralian", "Crimean Turks", and Azerbaijanis.

Re-settlement efforts

By 1942, Hitler's empire encompassed much of Europe, but the territories annexed lacked population desired by the Nazis. After Germany had acquired her Lebensraum, she now needed to populate these lands according to Nazi ideology and racial principles. This was to be accomplished before the end of the war by a "reordering of ethnographical relations". The initial step of this project had already been taken by Hitler on 7 October 1939, when Himmler was named the Reich Commissar for the Consolidation of Germandom (Reichskommissar für die Festigung deutschen Volkstums) (RKFDV) (see also Hauptamt Volksdeutsche Mittelstelle, VoMi) This position authorized Himmler to repatriate ethnic Germans (Volksdeutsche) living abroad to occupied Poland. Himmler's jurisdiction as the guardian of the Volksdeutsche re-settlement efforts was increased to other occupied territories to be Germanized as the war continued. To make room for the German settlers, hundreds of thousands of Poles and French living in these lands were transferred across borders. The great majority of Himmler's Volksdeutsche were acquired from the Soviet sphere of interest under the German–Soviet "population exchange" treaty.

At the end of 1942 a total of 629,000 Volksdeutsche had been re-settled, and preparations for the transfer of 393,000 others were underway. The long-term goal of the VoMi was the resettlement of a further 5.4 million Volksdeutsche, mainly from Transylvania, Banat, France, Hungary and Romania. The immigrants were classified either as racially or politically unreliable (settled in Altreich), of high quality (settled in the annexed eastern territories) or suitable for transit camps. Himmler encountered considerable difficulties with the Volksdeutsche of France and Luxembourg, who often wished to retain their former status as citizens of their respective countries.

Spain and Portugal 
Spanish dictator General Francisco Franco contemplated joining the war on the German side. The Spanish Falangists made numerous border claims. Franco claimed French Basque departments, Catalan-speaking Roussillon, Cerdagne and Andorra. Spain also wanted to reclaim Gibraltar from the United Kingdom because of the symbolic and strategic value. Franco also called for the reunification of Morocco as a Spanish protectorate, the annexation of the Oran district from French Algeria and large-scale expansion of Spanish Guinea. This last project was especially unfeasible because it overlapped German territorial ambition to reclaim German Cameroon and Spain would most likely be forced to give up Guinea entirely. Spain also sought federation with Portugal on common cultural and historical grounds (such as the Iberian Union).

After the Spanish refusal to join the war, Spain and Portugal were expected to be invaded and become puppet states. They were to turn over coastal cities and islands in the Atlantic to Germany as part of the Atlantic Wall and to serve as German naval facilities. Portugal was to cede Portuguese Mozambique and Portuguese Angola as part of the intended Mittelafrika colonial project.

Plans for other parts of the world outside Europe

Plans for the establishment of an African colonial dominion

Hitler's geopolitical thoughts about Africa always occupied a secondary position to his expansionist aims in Europe itself. His public announcements prior to outbreak of the war that Germany's former colonies be returned to it served primarily as bargaining chips to further territorial goals in Europe itself. Africa was nevertheless expected to fall under German control in some way or another after Germany had first achieved supremacy over its own continent.

Hitler's overall intentions for the future organization of Africa divided the continent into three overall. The northern third was to be assigned to its Italian ally, while the central part would fall under German rule. The remaining southern sector would be controlled by a pro-Nazi Afrikaner state built on racial grounds. In early 1940 Foreign Minister Ribbentrop had communicated with South African leaders thought to be sympathetic to the Nazi cause, informing them that Germany was to reclaim its former colony of German South-West Africa, then a mandate of the Union of South Africa. South Africa was to be compensated by the territorial acquisitions of the British protectorates of Swaziland, Basutoland and Bechuanaland and the colony of Southern Rhodesia. On the division of French African colonies between the Spanish and Italian governments Hitler refused to provide any official promises during the war, however, fearful of losing the support of Vichy France.

In 1940 the general staff of the Kriegsmarine (navy) produced a much more detailed plan accompanied by a map showing a proposed German colonial empire delineated in blue (the traditional color used in German cartography to indicate the German sphere of influence as opposed to the red or pink that represented the British Empire) in sub-Saharan Africa, extending from the Atlantic Ocean to the Indian Ocean. The proposed domain was supposed to fulfill the long-sought territorial German goal of Mittelafrika, and even further beyond. It would provide a base from which Germany would achieve a pre-eminent position on the African continent just as the conquest of Eastern Europe was to achieve a similar status over the continent of Europe.

In contrast to territories that were to be acquired in Europe itself (specifically European Russia), these areas were not envisaged as targets for extensive German population settlement. The establishment of a vast colonial empire was to serve primarily economic purposes, for it would provide Germany with most natural resources that it would not be able to find in its continental possessions, as well as an additional nearly unlimited supply of labor. Racialist policies would nevertheless be strictly enforced on all inhabitants (meaning segregation of Europeans and blacks and punishing of interracial relationships) to maintain "Aryan" purity.

The area included all pre-1914 German colonial territories in Africa, as well as additional parts of the French, Belgian and British colonial holdings in Africa. These included the French and Belgian Congos, Northern and Southern Rhodesia (the latter going perhaps to South Africa), Nyasaland, southern Kenya with Nairobi (northern Kenya was to be given to Italy), Uganda, Gabon, Ubangui-Chari, Nigeria, Dahomey, the Gold Coast, Zanzibar, nearly all of Niger and Chad, as well as the naval bases of Dakar and Bathurst.

A second part of the plan entailed the construction of a huge string of fortified naval and air bases for future operations against the Western hemisphere, spanning much of the Atlantic coastline of Europe and Africa from Trondheim in Norway all the way down to the Belgian Congo, as well as many off-lying islands such as Cape Verde and the Azores. A less extensive but similar initiative was intended for the east coast of Africa.

Division of Asia between the Axis powers

In 1942, a secret diplomatic conference was held between Nazi Germany and the Japanese Empire in which they agreed to divide Asia along a line that followed the Yenisei River to the border of China, and then along the border of China and the Soviet Union, the northern and western borders of Afghanistan, and the border between Iran and British India (which included what is now Pakistan). This treaty, of which a draft was presented to the Germans by ambassador Hiroshi Ōshima, was rejected by the German Foreign Office and the Navy, as it allocated India to Japan and limited the Kriegsmarine'''s operations in the Indian Ocean. Hitler, however, found the treaty acceptable, leading to its signing on 18 January 1942.

The treaty proved to be detrimental for Axis strategic cooperation in the Indian Ocean, as crossing the boundary line required tedious prior consultation. This made any joint German-Japanese offensive against British positions in the Middle East impossible. Japanese operations against Allied shipping lines during the Indian Ocean raid had been highly successful along with the attack against Ceylon, but these were not followed due to the non-existent German-Japanese strategic cooperation. The Germans vigorously maintained watch on the demarcation line and objected to any Japanese incursion to the "German sphere" of the Axis-divided world. Thus the Japanese were forced to cancel a planned massive attack against Madagascar, as the island had been delegated to Germany in the treaty.

Concession of Oceania to Japan

Germany's former colonial possessions in the Pacific (German New Guinea and German Samoa), which had been allocated to Australia and New Zealand after World War I as C-Class Mandates according to the Treaty of Versailles, were to be sold to Japan (both Weimar and Nazi-era Germany never relinquished claims to their pre-war colonial territories) at least temporarily in the interest of the Tripartite Pact, its alliance with that country.  Australia and New Zealand were designated as future Japanese territories, although Hitler lamented his belief that the white race would disappear from those regions. He nevertheless made it clear to his officials that "the descendants of the convicts in Australia" were not Germany's concern and that their lands would be colonized by Japanese settlers in the immediate future, an opinion also shared by Joseph Goebbels, who expressed his conviction in his diary that the Japanese had always desired "the fifth continent" for emigration purposes. Hitler loathed New Zealanders as a “lower form of human being”, apparently without consideration to actual ethnicity. At a speech given on 15 July 1925- his only recorded lengthy discussion on New Zealand- he argued that New Zealanders lived in trees and ”clambered around on all fours” having not yet learned to walk upright. The speech was later reprinted as a pamphlet. Historian Norman Rich stated that it can be assumed that Hitler would have attempted to recruit the Anglo-Saxons of these two countries as colonists for the conquered east; some of the English were to share the same fate.

Middle East and Central Asia

After the projected fall of the Soviet Union, Hitler planned to intensify the war in the Mediterranean. The OKW produced studies concerning an attack against the Suez Canal through Turkey, an offensive towards Baghdad-Basra from the Caucasus (most of which was already under German occupation as a result of Fall Blau) in support of revolting Arab nationalists, and operations in Afghanistan and Iran directed against British India. Hitler did not envision German colonization of the region, and was most likely to allow Italian dominance at least over the Levant.Weinberg (2005), p. 19 The Jews of the Middle East were to be murdered, as Hitler had promised to the Grand Mufti of Jerusalem in November 1941 (see Einsatzgruppe Egypt).

Turkey was favored as a potential ally by Hitler because of its important strategic location on the boundaries of Europe, Asia, and Africa, as well as its extensive history as a state hostile against the Russian Empire and the later Soviet Union. To assure that Germany wanted to work with them on a long-range basis, the Turks were guaranteed an equal status in the German-dominated order, and were promised a number of territories which they might desire for reasons of security. These encompassed Edirne (Adrianople) and an expansion of Turkish frontiers at the expense of Greece, the creation of buffer states in the Caucasus under Turkish influence, a revision of the Turkish-Syrian frontier (the Baghdad Railway and the State of Aleppo) and the Turkish-Iraqi frontier (the Mosul region), as well as a settlement of "the Aegean question" to provide Turkey with suitable protection against encroachments from Italy. The Black Sea (which Hitler derided as "a mere frog-pond") was also to be conceded to Turkey as part of its sphere of influence, for this would negate the need of stationing a German navy in the region to replace the Soviet Black Sea Fleet. Crimea (tentatively dubbed Gotenland by the Nazis) was nevertheless to be fortified to ensure permanent German possession of the peninsula, and the Black Sea exploited as an "unlimited" resource of seafood.

Allied-occupied Iran was also to be drawn into the Axis camp, possibly by the means of an uprising. The possibility of Iran as an anti-Soviet bastion was already considered in the 1930s, and coincided with Hitler's declaration of Iran as an "Aryan state" (the name Iran literally means "homeland of the Aryans" in Persian). The changing of Persia's name to Iran in 1935 was done by the Shah at the suggestion of the German ambassador to Iran as an act of "Aryan solidarity". However the Iranians had always called their country "Iran", a name that predated the rise of Nazi Germany by more than a thousand years. On the eve of World War II Germany was already Iran's single-biggest trading partner, followed by the Soviet Union, United Kingdom, and the United States.

During pre-war diplomatic maneuvers, the NSDAP Office of Foreign Affairs took special interest in Afghanistan, believing that the German Empire had failed to exploit the country diplomatically during the First World War despite the Niedermayer-Hentig Expedition. The objective was to ensure that the country would remain neutral during a possible German-British conflict and even use it militarily against British India or Soviet Russia. Despite the NSDAP Foreign Office's good relations with the Afghan government, the Foreign Ministry under Ribbentrop favored overthrowing the current government and restoration of the rule of Amānullāh Khān, who had been living in exile since 1929. Hitler eventually came to support Rosenberg's office on this issue. After the German-French armistice of 1940, the Kabul government tried to question Berlin on German plans concerning the future of Afghanistan. Of special interest were the post-war borders of the country - the Afghan government hoped to see the re-incorporation of 15 million ethnic Pashtuns which had been placed in British India thanks to the Durand Line, and the securing of the northern Indian border so that an expansion towards the Indian Ocean became possible (See Pashtunistan). As the Nazi–Soviet Axis talks of October–November were then underway (and the possible expansion of the Soviet sphere of influence in south-central Asia and India was on the table), Berlin was reluctant to give any binding offers to Kabul.

The Third Saudi State under Ibn Saud was seen as a natural ally, and was to be given territorial concessions in south-west Arabia and Transjordan. Also, a post-war satellite Greater Arab Union was discussed.

Although initially intending to concede Italy control of the region, after that country had defected to the Allied camp in 1943, Hitler came to regard the Islamic countries and the Pan-Arab movement increasingly more as the natural ally of National Socialist Germany, as opposed to the "treacherous" Italians. On 17 February 1945 in particular he explained to his entourage his regrets that Germany's prior alliance with its southern neighbor had prevented her from pursuing a more revolutionary policy towards the Arab world, which would have also allowed its exit from the British and French spheres of influence in the area:

Hitler's plans for India

Hitler's views on India were generally disparaging, and his plans for the region were heavily influenced by his racial views. Though many Indian nationalists looked to Nazi Germany as a potential ally in their struggle against British colonial rule, Hitler "made no secret of his contempt for anticolonial movements." In May 1930, Hitler wrote that the Indian independence movement was carried out by the "lower Indian race against the superior English Nordic race", and referred to Indians as "Asiatic jugglers".  Seven years later in 1937, Hitler informed British Foreign Secretary Lord Halifax that the British should "shoot Gandhi, and if this doesn't suffice to reduce them to submission, shoot a dozen leading members of the Congress, and if that doesn't suffice shoot 200, and so on, as you make it clear that you mean business." During the same discussion Hitler reportedly told Halifax that one of his favorite films was The Lives of a Bengal Lancer, because it depicted a handful of "superior race" Britons holding sway over the Indian subcontinent.

Nazi theorist Alfred Rosenberg, who shared Hitler's racial and political views on India, claimed that although Vedic culture was Aryan in origin, any Nordic blood in India had long since dissipated due to racial miscegenation. Asit Krishna Mukherji, with support of the German consulate, published The New Mercury, a National Socialist magazine and was lauded by Baron von Selzam in a "communiqué to all German legations in the Far East that no one had rendered services to the Third Reich in Asia comparable to those of Sir Asit Krishna Mukherji's." Savitri Devi, who would later marry him, shared his beliefs "in the pan Aryan revival of India", as well as in Hindu nationalism, and once World War II started, both "undertook clandestine war work on behalf of the Axis powers in Calcutta."

During the first years of the war in Europe, as Hitler sought to reach an arrangement with the British, he held the notion that India should remain under British control after the war, as in his mind the only alternative was a Soviet occupation of the subcontinent. As the British had rejected German peace offers, Hitler ordered on 17 February 1941 to prepare a military study for a post-Barbarossa operation in Afghanistan against India. The goal of this operation was not so much to conquer the subcontinent, but to threaten British military positions there to force the British to come to terms. A week later the Afghanistan operation was the subject of a discussion between head of the Army General Staff Franz Halder, Oberbefehlshaber des Heeres Walter von Brauchitsch and chief of the Operationsabteilung OKH Adolf Heusinger. In an assessment produced on 7 April 1941, Halder estimated that the operation would require 17 divisions and one separate regiment. A Special Bureau for India was created with these goals in mind.

Indian revolutionary Subhas Chandra Bose escaped from India on 17 January 1941 and arrived in Berlin via Moscow. There he proposed organizing an Indian national government in exile and urged the Axis to declare their support for the Indian cause. He eventually managed to extract such promises from Japan after the Fall of Singapore and later on from Italy as well, but the Germans refused. Bose was granted an audience with Benito Mussolini, but Hitler initially refused to see him, although he did acquire access to Joachim von Ribbentrop after much difficulty. The German Foreign Ministry was skeptical of any such endeavors, as the German goal was to use Bose for propaganda and subversive activity, especially following the model of the 1941 pro-Axis coup in Iraq. These propaganda measures included anti-Raj radio broadcasts and the recruitment of Indian prisoners of war for the "Free India Legion". Bose eventually met with Hitler on 29 May 1942. During the discussion, which mostly consisted of Hitler monologing to Bose, Hitler expressed his skepticism for India's readiness for a rebellion against the Raj, and his fears of a Soviet takeover of India. He stated that if Germany had to do anything about India it would first have to conquer Russia, for the road to India could only be accomplished through that country, although he did promise to financially support Bose and help relocate him to the Far East. Bose later described the encounter by stating that it was impossible to get Hitler involved in any serious political discussion.

On 18 January 1942, it was decided that the Indian subcontinent was to be divided between the Axis powers. Germany was to take the part of British India roughly corresponding to the western part of modern-day Pakistan, while the rest of British India, along with Afghanistan, was marked for Japan.Weinberg (2005), p. 13.

 Hitler's plans for North America 

Before completing the expected German conquest of Europe, the Nazi leadership hoped to keep the United States out of the war. In an interview with Life in the spring of 1941, Hitler stated that a German invasion of the Western Hemisphere was as fantastic as an invasion of the moon, and he said he was convinced that the idea was being promoted by men who mistakenly thought that war would be good for business.

U.S. pro-Nazi movements such as the Friends of the New Germany and the German-American Bund played no role in Hitler's plans for the country, and received no financial or verbal support from Germany after 1935. However, certain Native American advocate groups, such as the fascist-leaning American Indian Federation, were to be used to undermine the Roosevelt administration from within by means of propaganda."American Indian Federation" at the Encyclopedia of Oklahoma History & Culture  Fictitious reports about Berlin declaring the Sioux as Aryans were circulated by the German-American Bund with the aim of increasing tensions between Native Americans and the government of the United States, impelling Native Americans to resist being drafted or registered by the Bureau of Indian Affairs; such rumours were reported by John Collier, commissioner of Indian Affairs, to the Congress as true, thus not merely spreading them further but also legitimating them in the eyes of many. As a boy, Hitler had been an enthusiastic reader of Karl May westerns and he told Albert Speer that he still turned to them for inspiration as an adult when he was in a tight spot.

Approximately nine months before the United States joined the Allies, U.S. President Franklin D. Roosevelt made a reference to the New Order in a speech he gave on March 15, 1941, recognizing Hitler's hostility towards the United States and the destructive potential it represented, about which Roosevelt was quite acutely aware:

Hitler held U.S. society in contempt, stating that the United States (which he consistently referred to as the "American Union") was "half Judaized, and the other half Negrified" and that "in so far as there are any decent people in America, they are all of  German origin". Already in his 1928 book Zweites Buch, he had maintained that National Socialist Germany must prepare for the ultimate struggle against the U.S. for hegemony. In mid-late 1941, as Hitler became overconfident of an Axis victory in Europe against the UK and the Soviet Union, he began planning an enormous extension of the Kriegsmarine, projected to include 25 battleships, 8 aircraft carriers, 50 cruisers, 400 submarines and 150 destroyers, far exceeding the naval expansion that had already been decided on in 1939's Plan Z. Historian Gerhard L. Weinberg stated that this super-fleet was intended against the Western Hemisphere. Hitler also considered the occupation of the Portuguese Azores, Cape Verde and Madeira and the Spanish Canary islands to deny the British a staging ground for military actions against Nazi-controlled Europe, and also to gain Atlantic naval bases and military airfields for operations against North America. Hitler desired to use the islands to "deploy long-range bombers against American cities from the Azores", via a plan that actually arrived on Hermann Göring's RLM office desks in the spring of 1942 for the design competition concerning such an aircraft. In July 1941, Hitler approached Japanese ambassador Ōshima with an offer to wage a joint struggle against the U.S.—Japan's own Project Z aircraft design program was one possible manner in which such a goal could be accomplished, all during the timeframe that the USAAC had itself, on April 11, 1941, first proposed a competition for airframe designs for the same sort of missions against the Axis forces, the Northrop XB-35 and the Convair B-36, flying directly from North American soil to attack Nazi Germany.

In this final battle for world domination, Hitler expected the defeated British to eventually support the Axis forces with its large navy. He stated that "England and America will one day have a war with one another, which will be waged with the greatest hatred imaginable. One of the two countries will have to disappear."  and "I shall no longer be there to see it, but I rejoice on behalf of the German people at the idea that one day we will see England and Germany marching together against America".

The actual physical conquest of the United States was unlikely, however, and the future disposition of U.S. territories remained cloudy in Hitler's mind. He perceived the anticipated battle with that country, at least under his own rule, to be a sort of "battle of the continents"—possibly along the lines of then-contemporary U.S. thought, such as the opening text from the second film in Frank Capra's Why We Fight series, illustrating one U.S. viewpoint of what Hitler could have thought on such matters while viewing the crowds at the 1934 Nuremberg rally—with a Nazi-dominated Old World fighting for global dominance against the New World, in which Germany would attain leadership of the world rather than establish direct control over it. Further decisions down the line were left up to future generations of German rulers.

Canada featured fairly little in Nazi conceptions of the post-war world. Because Hitler's political objectives were primarily focused on Eastern Europe before and during the war — in contrast to his own opinions towards the United States from 1928 in his unpublished volume, Zweites Buch—Hitler considered the United States a negligible political factor in the world, while Canada interested him even less. He politically grouped the country together with the United States in a U.S.-dominated North America, and considered it equally as "materialistic, racially bastardized, and decadent" as its southern neighbor. In 1942, when expressing his fear of an imminent collapse of the British Empire which he preferred to remain intact, Hitler believed that the United States would seize and annex Canada at the first opportunity, and that the Canadians would be quick to welcome such a move.

This lack of policy direction from the top meant that Nazi politicians concerned with representing Germany's interests and relations with Canada had to resort to an improvised line of policy which they believed to be in accordance with Hitler's wishes. The country was noted for its abundance of natural resources, and because of its great geographic size coupled with a low population density was characterized as "a country without people", in contrast to Germany which was considered "a people without space". In his 1934 travelogue account of Canada, Zwischen USA und dem Pol, German journalist Colin Ross described Canadian society as artificial because it was composed of many different parts that weren't tied together by either blood or long-standing traditions (highlighting the differences between the French and English Canadians in particular), and that for this reason one could not speak of either a Canadian nation or Volk. As a result, the country's political system was also considered mechanic and non-organic, and that Ottawa did not constitute "the heart of the nation". Because of both these factors the Canadians were deemed incapable of comprehending "true culture", and German immigration in Canada was considered a mistake because they would be forced to live in an "empty civilization".

Plans for the economic domination of South America
Neither Hitler nor any other major Nazi leader showed much interest towards South America, except as a warning example of "racial mixing". However, the NSDAP/AO was active in various South American countries (notably among German Brazilians and German Argentines), and trade relations between Germany and the South American countries were seen as of great importance. Between 1933 and 1941, the Nazi aim in South America was to achieve economic hegemony by expanding trade at the expense of the Western Powers. Hitler also believed that German-dominated Europe would displace the United States as the principal trading partner of the continent. Long-term Nazi hopes for political penetration of the region were placed on the local fascist movements, such as the Integralists in Brazil and fascists in Argentina, combined with the political activation of the German immigrant communities. Hitler also had hopes of seeing German immigrants "returning" from the Western Hemisphere to colonize the conquered East. Despite being occasionally suspicious of the South American Germans of adopting a "South attitude towards life", top Nazis believed that their experience working in underdeveloped areas would make them ideal settlers for the annexed eastern territories.

On 27 October 1941 Roosevelt stated in a speech "I have in my possession a secret map, made in Germany by Hitler's government, by planners of the new world order. It is a map of South America and part of Central America as Hitler proposes to organize it" into five countries under German domination. The speech amazed both the United States and Germany; the latter claimed the map was a forgery. While British Security Coordination indeed forged the map and arranged for discovery by the Federal Bureau of Investigation, it likely was based in part on a real, public map of boundary changes German agents used to persuade South American countries to join the New Order.

Plans for future wars against Asia

Although it pursued an alliance with Imperial Japan in the battle against the "Western Plutocracies" and Soviet Bolshevism which was based on Realpolitik, the Nazi leadership believed that its alliance with Japan was only temporary. The racial ideology of Nazism predicted that the fate of human civilization depended on the ultimate triumph of the Germanic-Nordic peoples, and according to it, the populous Asian continent was seen as the greatest threat to the hegemony of the white race. The Japanese people were characterized as 'culture-bearers', which meant that they could make use of the technological and civilizational achievements of the Aryan race and by so doing, they could maintain an advanced society, but they could not truly create a 'culture' themselves. Gerhard Weinberg asserts that the historical evidence points to the conclusion that Hitler, like he had done with the Soviets in the 1939–1941 period, employed a tactic of conceding to the Japanese whatever they desired until they in turn could be defeated in a subsequent war. In early 1942, Hitler is quoted as saying to Ribbentrop: "We have to think in terms of centuries. Sooner or later there will have to be a showdown between the white and the yellow races."

In July 1941, as plans were being laid out for post-Barbarossa military operations, the Wehrmacht's naval top-level command, the Oberkommando der Marine, was not ready to exclude the possibility of a war between Germany and Japan. In 1942, NSDAP official Erhard Wetzel (Reich Ministry for the Occupied Eastern Territories) predicted that "the self-determination of the numerically strong Asian peoples after this war" would challenge German-controlled Europe with Japanese instigation, and stated that "a Greater Asia and an independent India are formations that dispose over hundreds of millions of inhabitants. A German world power with 80 or 85 million Germans by contrast is numerically too weak". Wetzel further pondered on Germany's choices on the population policies in occupied Russia: if the Russians were restricted to having as few children as possible in the interest of German colonization, this would further "weaken the white race in view of the dangers of Asia".

As the Japanese were conquering one European colonial territory after another in Asia and Oceania, and while they were also seemingly poised to take over Australia and New Zealand as a result of their conquests, Hitler believed that the white race would completely disappear in these regions, which he considered a turning point in human history. He was relieved by the fact that Japan had entered the war on Germany's side, however, because he had long hoped to use that country as a strategic counterweight to the United States, based on his belief that Japanese hegemony in East Asia and the Pacific would guarantee the security of both countries by deterring the ambitions of other powers. Looking into the future, he remarked that "There's one thing Japan and Germany have in common; both of us need fifty to a hundred years for purposes of digestion: we for Russia, they for the Far East".

In his speech which he made during the meeting of SS major-Generals in Posen on 4 October 1943, Heinrich Himmler commented on future conflicts between Nazi-controlled Europe and Asia:

Himmler addressed this apocalyptic vision in an earlier speech which he made in the presence of SS generals at the University of Kharkiv, Ukraine in April 1943. He first spoke on the necessity of the war against the Soviets and Jewry:

End of the New Order project

After the decisive German defeat at the end of the Battle of Stalingrad on 2 February 1943, Germany was forced to go on the defensive and as a result, it was no longer able to actively pursue its implementation of the New Order in the Soviet Union, but it was able to continue its genocide against the Jews, the Romani, and other minorities. Following the subsequent failure of the 1943 summer offensive and the resulting failure to regain the territories which it lost to the Soviets earlier that year, the Wehrmacht was no longer able to mount an effective large-scale counter-attack on the Eastern Front. In a discussion with Joseph Goebbels on 26 October 1943, Hitler opined that Germany should conclude a temporary armistice with the Soviet Union and return to its 1941 border in the east. This would then give Germany the opportunity to defeat the British forces in the west first, before resuming a new war for Lebensraum against the Soviet Union at a later point in time. Hitler thought that his future successor might have to carry out this later war, because he believed that he himself would be too old by then.

Late in the war, after the failure of the final Ardennes offensive and after the successful Allied crossing of the Rhine into Germany itself, Hitler hoped that a decisive victory on the Eastern Front might still enable the Nazi regime to preserve itself, resulting in Operation Spring Awakening. He believed that, with the conclusion of a separate peace-treaty with the Soviet Union, a division of Poland might still be realized and leave Hungary and Croatia (at that time, the former was still under German occupation, the latter was a Croatian fascist puppet state) under German control. Hitler only acknowledged Germany's imminent defeat mere days prior to his suicide.

See also

 Areas annexed by Nazi Germany
 Greater Germanic Reich, the domain which the Nazis tried to create by merging all of the Germanic-populated countries in Europe into one state.
 Greater East Asia Co-Prosperity Sphere, the envisioned Japanese economic equivalent of the New Order and the Greater Germanic Reich.
 A-A line
 Jewish settlement in the Japanese Empire
 SS State of Burgundy
 The Ural Mountains in Nazi planning
 Wehrbauer
 Imperial Italy (fascist), the Fascist Italian project for securing dominion over the area around the Mediterranean Sea.
 Axis power negotiations on the division of Asia during World War II
 Grossdeutschland
 Drang nach Osten ("The Drive Eastward")
 Lebensraum
 Generalplan Ost
 Lebensborn
 Final solution
 The Holocaust
 Hunger Plan
 Romani Holocaust
 European theater of World War II
 German-occupied Europe
 German war crimes
 War crimes of the Wehrmacht
 Italian war crimes
 Japanese war crimes
 New world order (international relations theory)
 Posen speeches – In two notable speeches which he made in October 1943, Himmler details the tasks which the SS should complete during its implementation of the New Order.
 Hegemony
 Hypothetical Axis victory in World War II

Citations

References

Further reading
 Evans, Richard J. The Third Reich at War (2009) pp 321–402
 
 Fritz, Stephen G. Ostkrieg: Hitler's War of Extermination in the East (2011)
 Longerich, Peter. Heinrich Himmler: A Life (2012)
 Lund, Joachim. "Denmark and the 'European New Order', 1940-1942," Contemporary European History, (2004) 13#3 pp 305–321,
 Mazower, Mark. Hitler's Empire: How the Nazis Ruled Europe (2009)
 Mazower, Mark. "Hitler's New Order, 1939-45," Diplomacy and Statecraft (1996) 3#1 pp 29–53,
 Snyder, Timothy. Bloodlands: Europe Between Hitler and Stalin'' (2010)

Nazism
Fascism
Nazi Germany
Politics of World War II
1941 in Germany
Axis powers